Mundolinco is a constructed language created by the Dutch author J. Braakman in 1888. It is notable for apparently being the first Esperantido, i.e. the first Esperanto derivative.

Major changes from Esperanto include combining the adjective and adverb with the grammatical ending -e (whereas Esperanto uses -a for adjectives and -e for adverbs), changes to the verb conjugations, an increase in the number of Latin roots, and new affixes such as the superlative suffix -osim- where Esperanto uses the particle plej. It seems there was no accusative or adjectival agreement.

Numerals 1–10: un, du, tres, cvarto, cvinto, siso, septo, octo, nono, desem.

Writing System 
There are no diacritics in the alphabet.

Example 
 Mundolinco:
Digne Amiso! Hodie mi factos conesso con el nove universe linco del sinjoro Braakman. Mi perstudies ho linco presimente en cvinto hori ! … Ce ho linco essos el fasilosime del mundo…
 Esperanto:
Digna Amiko! Hodiaŭ mi ekkonis la novan universalan lingvon de sinjoro Braakman. Mi pristudis tiun lingvon rapide en kvin horoj! … Ĉi tiu lingvo estas la plej facila de la mondo…
 English:
Dignified friend! Today I became aware of the new universal language of Mr Braakman. I studied that language rapidly over five hours! … This language is the easiest in the world…

References 
 Braakmann, J. System voor eene internationale Reis- of Handelstaal: onder der naam van El Mundolinco, Dat is Wereldtaal. 2nd edition. Noordwijk, J.C. van Dillen, 1894.

External links 

International auxiliary languages
Esperantido
Constructed languages introduced in the 1880s
1888 introductions
Constructed languages